This is a list of cities, towns, villages and other settlements in the ceremonial county of West Midlands, England (not the West Midlands region).

A
 Acocks Green, Aldridge, Aldersley, All Saints, Allesley, Allesley Green, Allesley Park, Alton, Alum Rock, Alumwell, Amblecote, Ashmore Park, Aston, Audnam

B

Ball Hill, Balsall Common, Balsall Heath, Barr Beacon, Barston, Bartley Green, Bearwood, Beechdale, Bell Green, Bentley, Bentley Heath, Berkswell, Bickenhill, Billesley Binley, Birchfield, Bilston, Birmingham, Bishopsgate Green, Blackheath, Blakenall Heath, Blakenhall, Blossomfield, Bloxwich, Boldmere, Bordesley, Bordesley Green, Bournbrook, Bournville, Bradley, Bradmore, Brandhall, Brandwood, Brierley Hill, Bromford, Bromley, Brownhills, Brownhills West, Browns Green, Buckland End, Buckpool (Wordsley), Bushbury

C
Caldmore, California, Canley, Cannon Park, Castle Bromwich, Castle Vale, Castlecroft, Catherine-de-Barnes, Chadwick End, Chapelfields, Charlemont and Grove Vale, Chelmsley Wood, Cheswick Green, Cheylesmore, Chinese Quarter, Chuckery, Claregate, Clayhanger, Clifford Park, Coalpool, Coleshill Heath, Colesley, Compton, Convention Quarter, Copt Heath, Cotteridge, Coundon, Courthouse Green, Coventry, Cradley Heath

D
Darlaston, Deritend, Dickens Heath, Digbeth, Dorridge, Druids Heath, Duddeston, Dudley, Dunstall Hill

E
Earlsdon, Earlswood, Eastern Green, Eastside, Edgbaston, Edgwick, Elmdon, Elmdon Heath, Erdington, Ernesford Grange, Ettingshall, Evesham.

F
Falcon Lodge, Fallings Park, Finchfield, Finham, Five Ways, Foleshill, Fordbridge, Fordhouses, Four Oaks, Fox & Goose, Frankley, Fullbrook

G
Garretts Green, Gibbet Hill, Goldthorn Park, Gosta Green, Graiseley, Gravelly Hill, Great Barr, Greet, Gun Quarter, Guns Village

H
Hall Green, Halesowen, Hamstead, Handsworth, Handsworth Wood, Harborne, Harden, Hampton-in-Arden, Harden, Hawbush, Hawkesley, Hay Mills, Heath Town, High Heath, Highgate, Highgate, Hill Hook, Hill Top, Hillfields, Hockley, Hockley Heath, Hodge Hill, Holbrooks, Horseley Heath, Hurst Green, Hurst Hill

I
Irish Quarter

J
Jericho, Jewellery Quarter

K
Kates Hill, Keresley, Kings Heath, Kings Norton, Kingshurst, Kingstanding, Kingswinford, Kitts Green, Knowle

L
Ladywood, Lanesfield, Langley Green, Leamore, Lee Bank, Little Aston, Little Bloxwich, Little Bromwich, Longbridge, Longford, Low Hill, Lozells, Lye, Lyndon, Lower Farm Estate

M
Maney, Marston Green, Masshouse, Mere Green, Meriden, Merridale, Merry Hill, Minworth, Monkspath Street, Monmore Green, Moseley, Mount Nod, Moxley

N
Nechells, Netherton, New Frankley, New Invention, New Oscott, Newbridge, Northfield

O
Oakham, Ocker Hill, Old Hill, Old Oscott, Oldswinford, Oldbury, Olton, Oscott

P
Packwood, Palfrey, Park Hall, Park Village, Pedmore, Pelham, Pelsall, Penn, Penn Fields, Pensnett, Pendeford, Perry Barr, Perry Beeches, Perry Common, Pheasey, Pleck, Portobello, Princes End, Pype Hayes

Q
Quarry Bank, Queslett, Quinton

R
Radford, Rednal, Roughley, Rowley Regis, Rubery, Rugeley Rushall Ryecroft

S
Saltley, Sandwell, Sarehole, Sedgley, Selly Oak, Selly Park, Shard End, Sharmans Cross, Sheldon, Shelfield, Shenley Green, Shire Oak, Shirley, Short Heath, Short Heath, Signal Hayes, Silhill, Small Heath, Smethwick, Smithfield, Smith's Wood, Soho, Solihull, South Yardley, Sparkbrook, Sparkhill, Spon End, Spring Hill, Springfield, Stafford, Stechford, Stirchley, Stoke, Stoke Heath, Stoke Aldermoor, Stourbridge, Streetly, Styvechale, Summerhill, Sutton Coldfield

T
Temple Balsall, Tettenhall, Tettenhall Regis, Tettenhall Wightwick, Tettenhall Wood, The Delves, The Straits, Thimble End, Tidbury Green, Tile Hill, Tipton, Tividale, Tower Hill, Tyburn, Tyseley, Tamworth

U

V

W
Wake Green, Wall Heath, Walmley, Walsall, Walsall Wood, Walsgrave-On-Sowe, Ward End, Warley, Warwick Bar, Washwood Heath, Wednesfield, Wednesbury, Weoley Castle, Weoley Hill, West Bromwich, West Heath, Westwood Heath, Whitehouse Common, Whitley, Whitlock's End, Whitmore Reans, Whoberley, Wightwick, Willenhall (Coventry), Willenhall (West Midlands), Winson Green, Withymoor Village, Witton, Wollaston, Wollescote, Wolverhampton, Wood End (Coventry), Wood End (Wolverhampton), Woodgate, Wordsley, Wren's Nest, Wyken, Wylde Green

X

Y
Yardley, Yardley Wood, Yew Tree

Z

See also
List of places in England

West Midlands
Places
Populated places in the West Midlands (county)